Clyde Leonard Garrett (December 16, 1885 – December 18, 1959) was a U.S. Representative from Texas.

Born on a farm near Gorman, Texas, Garrett attended the public schools and Hankins' Normal College in his native city.
Raised on a farm.
He worked as a railroad section hand.
He taught school at Sweetwater, Texas, in 1906 and 1907.
Deputy in the office of the tax collector 1907-1912.
County clerk of Eastland County, Texas from 1913 to 1919.
He engaged in the real estate, insurance, and banking businesses 1920-1922.
City manager of the city of Eastland, Texas, in 1922 and 1923.
County judge 1929-1936.

Garrett was elected as a Democrat to the Seventy-fifth and Seventy-sixth Congresses (January 3, 1937 – January 3, 1941).
He was an unsuccessful candidate for renomination in 1940.
Administrative officer in the office of the Secretary of Commerce from January 15, 1941, to May 1, 1942, at which time he became staff specialist in the Office of War Information and served until October 15, 1943.
He was an unsuccessful candidate for Democratic nomination to the Seventy-ninth Congress in 1944.
Technical assistant, Veterans Administration, Washington, D.C., and Dallas, Texas from 1949 to 1950.
Manager, Veterans Administration regional office, Waco, Texas from 1951 to 1956.
He was an unsuccessful candidate for Eastland County judgeship in 1958.
He died in Eastland, Texas, December 18, 1959.
He was interred in Eastland Cemetery.

Sources

External links
 

1885 births
1959 deaths
People from Gorman, Texas
Democratic Party members of the United States House of Representatives from Texas
20th-century American politicians